The following events occurred in February 1937:

February 1, 1937 (Monday)
George VI released the New Year Honours list, one month late due to the abdication crisis. Queen Elizabeth was made Dame Grand Cross of the Royal Victorian Order.
Argentina defeated Brazil 2-0 at the Estadio Gasómetro in Buenos Aires to win the South American Championship of football.
The French aircraft manufacturer SNCASE was founded.
Born: Don Everly, member of The Everly Brothers rock and roll duo, in Brownie, Kentucky (d. 2021); Garrett Morris, comedian and actor, in New Orleans, Louisiana

February 2, 1937 (Tuesday)
Senjūrō Hayashi became the new Prime Minister of Japan.
Born: Remak Ramsay, actor, in Baltimore, Maryland; Tom Smothers, one-half of the Smothers Brothers musical comedy team, in New York City

February 3, 1937 (Wednesday)
The Battle of Málaga began.
The 33rd International Eucharistic Congress opened in Manila, Philippines. It was the first eucharistic congress held in Asia.
Born: Billy Meier, author and ufologist, in Bülach, Switzerland; Alex Young, footballer, in Loanhead, Scotland (d. 2017)

February 4, 1937 (Thursday)
Willie Gallacher, the lone Communist Member of Parliament, caused an uproar in the House when he asserted that the Regency Bill under discussion was clearly "directed towards the occupant of the Throne at the present time" because he was "suspect." Conservative Member Earl Winterton jumped to his feet and declared that not even a Member "who represents so small an amount of opinion in the country" as Gallacher "should be permitted to get away with the monstrous assertion which he has just made", and said it "could only have come from someone who approaches the subject with a distorted brain."
Joachim von Ribbentrop committed a social gaffe when he gave the Nazi salute to George VI, nearly knocking over the king who was stepping forward to shake Ribbentrop's hand.
Born: Magnar Solberg, biathlete, in Soknedal, Norway

February 5, 1937 (Friday)
Judicial Procedures Reform Bill: U.S. President Franklin D. Roosevelt delivered a surprise message to Congress recommending a drastic revision of the Supreme Court. The plan would increase the number of judges from 9 to 15 if judges past the age of 70 refused to retire.
Died: Lou Andreas-Salomé, 75, Russian-born psychoanalyst and author

February 6, 1937 (Saturday)
The Battle of Jarama began.
Benito Mussolini's 20-year-old son Vittorio married Orsola Buvoli in Rome. About 1,000 people stood in the rain outside the church to view the comings and goings.

February 7, 1937 (Sunday)
40,000 leftists marched in Paris in observance of the third anniversary of the 6 February 1934 counter-demonstrations. Prime Minister Léon Blum stood in the rain to review them.
Born: Juan Pizarro, baseball player, in Santurce, Puerto Rico (d. 2021)
Died: Swami Akhandananda, 72, Indian monk; Elihu Root, 91, American lawyer and statesman

February 8, 1937 (Monday)
The Battle of Málaga ended in a decisive Nationalist victory with the capture of the city. The Málaga–Almería road massacre ensued.
Born: Manfred Krug, actor and singer, in Germany (d. 2016)

February 9, 1937 (Tuesday)
A United Air Lines passenger plane crashed into San Francisco Bay with the loss of all 11 people aboard. It was the first aviation accident to involve a Douglas DC-3.
Born: Clete Boyer, baseball player, in Cassville, Missouri (d. 2007); William Lawvere, mathematician, in Muncie, Indiana

February 10, 1937 (Wednesday)
A German appeals court ruled that children who failed to live up to the mental and physical standards of Nazi education could be taken away from their families and placed in state-run homes.
Born: Anne Anderson, reproductive physiologist, in Forres, Scotland (d. 1983), Roberta Flack, singer, in Black Mountain, North Carolina (some sources give birth date as 1939)

February 11, 1937 (Thursday)
The Flint sit-down strike ended when General Motors agreed to recognize the United Auto Workers.
Joachim von Ribbentrop formally presented the British Foreign Office with a demand for the return of Germany's colonies.
An issue of the British weekly news magazine Cavalcade was banned for running an article referring to rumors of the king having suffered an attack of epilepsy.
Aviator Amelia Earhart announced she would attempt to circumnavigate the globe as close to the equator as possible.
Born: Bill Lawry, cricketer, in Thornbury, Victoria, Australia; Eddie Shack, ice hockey player, in Sudbury, Ontario, Canada (d. 2020)
Died: Walter Burley Griffin, 60, American architect

February 12, 1937 (Friday)
The International Brigades halted the Nationalist advance at Jarama.
The National Football League admitted the Cleveland Rams.
The musical film When You're in Love starring Grace Moore and Cary Grant was released.
Born: Charles Dumas, Olympic high jumper, in Tulsa, Oklahoma (d. 2004); Vittorio Emanuele, Prince of Naples, in Naples, Italy
Died: Christopher Caudwell, 29, British Marxist writer (killed in the Spanish Civil War)

February 13, 1937 (Saturday)
A movie theater fire in Andong, China killed 685 people.
The Boston Redskins NFL team moved to Washington, D.C. and became the Washington Redskins.
Felix Kaspar of Austria won the men's competition of the World Figure Skating Championships in Vienna.
Born: Rupiah Banda, President of Zambia, in Gwanda, Southern Rhodesia

February 14, 1937 (Sunday)
A Nationalist warship shelled the Republican capital of Valencia for 30 minutes until counterfire from shore batteries forced its retreat. 
Austrian Chancellor Kurt Schuschnigg indicated that a referendum on the question of restoring the Habsburg monarchy might be held.
Born: Magic Sam, blues musician, in Grenada, Mississippi (d. 1969)

February 15, 1937 (Monday)
An underground explosion in a coal mine in Wonthaggi, Australia killed thirteen men.
11 were reported dead in flooding around southern Los Angeles.

February 16, 1937 (Tuesday)
To celebrate the birth of Vittorio Emanuele, Prince of Naples, Mussolini proclaimed a general amnesty cancelling or reducing prison sentences for many types of offences.
American chemist Wallace Carothers received a patent for nylon.
Died: Rodmond Roblin, 84, Canadian businessman and politician

February 17, 1937 (Wednesday)
10 men working on construction of the Golden Gate Bridge in San Francisco fell to their deaths when a section of scaffolding collapsed. 2 other workmen survived the fall.
Born: Mary Ann Mobley, actress and Miss America 1959, in Brandon, Mississippi (d. 2014)

February 18, 1937 (Thursday)
6 U.S. Marines were killed and 10 injured in a shell explosion aboard the battleship  during military exercises off the coast of San Clemente Island.
Film actress Mary Astor and film editor Manuel del Campo were married in Yuma, Arizona.
Died: Horatio Clarence Hocken, 79, Canadian politician and founder of the Toronto Star newspaper

February 19, 1937 (Friday)
Yekatit 12: Ethiopians attempted to assassinate Italian Viceroy Rodolfo Graziani in a grenade attack. Graziani and several of his staff were wounded. Italians would massacre 30,000 Ethiopians in reprisal killings over the next three days.
Born: Robert Walker, blues musician, near Clarksdale, Mississippi (d. 2017)

February 20, 1937 (Saturday)
Paraguay gave notice of its intent to withdraw from the League of Nations.
Hitler opened an auto show in Berlin featuring three test models of the Volkswagen.
The Indian National Congress won a majority of seats in six Indian provincial elections.
Born: Robert Huber, biochemist and Nobel laureate, in Munich, Germany; George Leonardos, author, in Alexandria, Egypt; Roger Penske, race car driver and team owner, in Shaker Heights, Ohio; Nancy Wilson, jazz singer, in Chillicothe, Ohio (d. 2018)

February 21, 1937 (Sunday)
Nearly 40,000 Republican militia launched an attack on Oviedo.
The Spanish government dismissed General José Asensio Torrado after the fall of Málaga.
France closed its border with Spain to keep foreign fighters and weapons out of the Civil War.
The Italians captured the leader of the Ethiopian resistance, Desta Damtew.
The first successful flying car, the Waterman Arrowbile, made its first flight.
Born: Ron Clarke, athlete and politician, in Melbourne, Australia (d. 2015); King Harald V of Norway, in Skaugum

February 22, 1937 (Monday)
Mussolini decreed that any native chieftain or officer who opposed Italian colonial troops, even in territory as yet unoccupied, would be put to death.
Died: James P. Buchanan, 69, American politician

February 23, 1937 (Tuesday)
Italy protested to Britain for inviting Haile Selassie to send an envoy to the king's coronation ceremony.
The seventh known victim of the Cleveland Torso Murderer was found.
Murray Murdoch of the New York Rangers became the first player in NHL history to appear in 500 consecutive games.
Died: Henry T. Mayo, 80, American admiral

February 24, 1937 (Wednesday)
In the Battle of Jarama, Republicans tried to take strategic Pingarrón Hill southeast of Madrid but were pushed back.
Died: Desta Damtew, 45?, leader of Ethiopian resistance (executed); Vladimir Ippolitovich Lipsky, 73, Ukrainian scientist and botanist; Humphrey Pearson, 43, American screenwriter and playwright (shot); Guy Standing, 63, English actor

February 25, 1937 (Thursday)
The British liner Llandovery Castle was sailing from Gibraltar to Marseilles carrying 100 passengers when it hit a naval mine off Cap de Creus. A large hole was torn in its hull but it managed to limp to Port-Vendres.
The John Steinbeck novella Of Mice and Men was published.
Born: Tom Courtenay, actor, in Hull, England; Bob Schieffer, television journalist, in Austin, Texas
Detective Comics No.1 was published

February 26, 1937 (Friday)
The play The Ascent of F6 by W. H. Auden and Christopher Isherwood premiered at the Mercury Theatre in London.

February 27, 1937 (Saturday)
The Battle of Jarama ended in a strategic Republican victory.
The French government passed a new defense plan extending the Maginot Line.
Canada won the World Ice Hockey Championships, held in London.
Died: Charles Donnelly, 22, Irish poet and activist (killed in the Spanish Civil War)

February 28, 1937 (Sunday)
Spanish Foreign Minister Julio Álvarez del Vayo scolded the European democracies for "lamentable weakness ... in the face of the tactics of Fascist nations to make themselves masters of the continent." Álvarez del Vayo declared that "the defense of Madrid is the defense of Paris and London tomorrow."
Died: Harrington Mann, 72, Scottish painter

References

1937
1937-02
1937-02